{{DISPLAYTITLE:Janko group J1}}

In the area of modern algebra known as group theory, the Janko group J1 is a sporadic simple group of order
   233571119 = 175560
 ≈ 2.

History
J1 is one of the 26 sporadic groups and was originally described by Zvonimir Janko in 1965. It is the only Janko group whose existence was proved by Janko himself and was the first sporadic group to be found since the discovery of the Mathieu groups in the 19th century.  Its discovery launched the modern theory of sporadic groups.

In 1986 Robert A. Wilson showed that J1 cannot be a subgroup of the monster group.  Thus it is one of the 6 sporadic groups called the pariahs.

Properties 

The smallest faithful complex representation of J1 has dimension 56. J1 can be characterized abstractly as the unique simple group with abelian 2-Sylow subgroups and with an involution whose centralizer is isomorphic to the direct product of the group of order two and the alternating group A5 of order 60, which is to say, the rotational icosahedral group. That was Janko's original conception of the group.
In fact Janko and Thompson were investigating groups similar to the Ree groups 2G2(32n+1), and showed that if a simple group G has abelian Sylow 2-subgroups and a centralizer of an involution of the form Z/2Z×PSL2(q) for q a prime power at least 3, then either q is a power of 3 and G has the same order as a Ree group (it was later shown that G must be a Ree group in this case) or q is 4 or 5. Note that PSL2(4)=PSL2(5)=A5. This last exceptional case led to the Janko group J1.

J1 is the automorphism group of the Livingstone graph, a distance-transitive graph with 266 vertices and 1463 edges.

J1 has no outer automorphisms and its Schur multiplier is trivial.

J1 is contained in the O'Nan group as the subgroup of elements fixed by an outer automorphism of order 2.

Construction
Janko found a modular representation in terms of 7 × 7 orthogonal matrices in the field of eleven elements, with generators given by

and

Y has order 7 and Z has order 5. Janko (1966) credited W. A. Coppel for recognizing this representation as an embedding into Dickson's simple group G2(11) (which has a 7-dimensional representation over the field with 11 elements).

There is also a pair of generators a, b such that

a2=b3=(ab)7=(abab−1)10=1

J1 is thus a Hurwitz group, a finite homomorphic image of the (2,3,7) triangle group.

Maximal subgroups
Janko (1966) found the 7 conjugacy classes of maximal subgroups of J1 shown in the table. Maximal simple subgroups of order 660 afford J1 a permutation representation of degree 266. He found that there are 2 conjugacy classes of subgroups isomorphic to the alternating group A5, both found in the simple subgroups of order 660.  J1 has non-abelian simple proper subgroups of only 2 isomorphism types.

The notation A.B means a group with a normal subgroup A with quotient B, and
D2n is the dihedral group of order 2n.

Number of elements of each order
The greatest order of any element of the group is 19.  The conjugacy class orders and sizes are found in the ATLAS.

References 

 Robert A. Wilson (1986). Is J1 a subgroup of the monster?, Bull. London Math. Soc. 18, no. 4 (1986), 349-350
 R. T. Curtis, (1993) Symmetric Representations II: The Janko group J1, J. London Math. Soc., 47 (2), 294-308.
 R. T. Curtis, (1996) Symmetric representation of elements of the Janko group J1, J. Symbolic Comp., 22, 201-214.

 Zvonimir Janko, A new finite simple group with abelian Sylow subgroups, Proc. Natl. Acad. Sci. USA 53 (1965) 657-658.
 Zvonimir Janko,  A new finite simple group with abelian Sylow subgroups and its characterization, Journal of Algebra 3: 147-186, (1966) 
 Zvonimir Janko and John G. Thompson, On a Class of Finite Simple Groups of Ree, Journal of Algebra, 4 (1966), 274-292.

External links 
 MathWorld: Janko Groups
 Atlas of Finite Group Representations: J1 version 2
 Atlas of Finite Group Representations: J1 version 3

Sporadic groups